Bobby Edward Duncum Jr. (August 26, 1965 – January 24, 2000) was an American professional wrestler. He was best known for his stint in World Championship Wrestling as a member of The West Texas Rednecks.

Professional wrestling career

Early career (1992–1995) 
After playing collegiate football for the University of Texas at Austin, and playing professionally for the Dallas Texans of the Arena Football League, Duncum debuted as a wrestler for the Texas-based Global Wrestling Federation in September 1992. Two months after his debut, he and Johnny Hawk, collectively known as The Texas Mustangs, won the Tag Team Championship from The Rough Riders (Black Bart and Johnny Mantell). After a little over two months, the Mustangs lost the title to The Bad Breed (Axl Rotten and Ian Rotten) on January 29, 1993. The Mustangs disbanded shortly after the title loss.

All Japan Pro Wrestling and Extreme Championship Wrestling (1995–1998)
After a two-year hiatus, Duncum returned to wrestling and made his All Japan Pro Wrestling debut on January 8, 1995, where he, Gary Albright and Joel Deaton defeated Eagle, Lacrosse and The Patriot. Throughout the next few years, Duncum would wrestle in several singles and six-man tag team matches while in AJPW, while also making appearances in the Dallas-based Continental Wrestling Alliance.

While still competing for AJPW, Duncum debuted in Extreme Championship Wrestling on February 14, 1997, where he defeated Balls Mahoney. He then began to split time between both promotions through the next few years, with his final ECW match being a loss to Mikey Whipwreck on July 18, 1998 and his final AJPW match being a tag team match in which he and Stan Hansen lost to Gary Albright and Yoshihiro Takayama on September 11.

World Championship Wrestling (1998-2000)

Debut (1998)
On the November 16 episode of WCW Monday Nitro, Duncum made his World Championship Wrestling debut as a fan favorite and defeated Chris Jericho in a World Television Championship match, but was unable to win Jericho's title due to winning via countout. Six days later at World War 3, Duncum made his pay-per-view debut and faced Jericho in a rematch for the title, but lost via pinfall. Duncum continued his feud with Jericho and defeated him twice at house shows and once more on the December 3 episode of Thunder before losing to him on the December 7 episode of Nitro. Duncum then formed a short-lived tag team with Mike Enos.

The West Texas Rednecks (1999–2000)

Duncum became a villain in the beginning of 1999 and joined Curt Hennig, Barry Windham and Kendall Windham to form a faction called The West Texas Rednecks. Although originally intended to be the villainous rivals of Master P's No Limit Soldiers, a faction of rappers, the Rednecks were instead embraced by the Southern wrestling fans of WCW and were cheered over the Soldiers. While Hennig and Barry would contend for the World Tag Team Championship, Duncum would compete in singles matches on Saturday Night and Thunder, including an unsuccessful attempt at winning the World Television Championship from Booker T on the April 15 episode of Thunder.

On June 13 at The Great American Bash, Duncum and Hennig lost to Konnan and Rey Mysterio Jr. of the No Limit Soldiers in a tag team match. Less than a month later, the Rednecks lost to the Soldiers once again at Bash at the Beach in an elimination tag team match on July 11. Following the end of their feud with the Soldiers, the Rednecks made their final pay-per-view appearance at Road Wild on August 14, where Duncum, Barry and Hennig lost to The Revolution (Dean Malenko, Perry Saturn and Shane Douglas) in a six-man tag team match.

Twelve days later on Thunder, Duncum made his final televised appearance as he, Barry and Kendall Windham lost to The Filthy Animals (Eddy Guerrero, Kidman and Rey Mysterio Jr.).

Personal life
Duncum's father, Bobby Duncum Sr., was also a professional wrestler.

Death
Duncum was found dead of an apparent drug overdose on January 24, 2000, at 5:00 in the morning by his roommate. He was 34 years old. Reports from stations KEYE-42 and KTBC Fox 7 in Austin mentioned that Duncum had gone through a divorce. An autopsy revealed that Duncum had overdosed on fentanyl, a painkiller that can be up to 100 times more potent than morphine. He did not have a prescription for the drug, and was supplied it by a relative. He had three patches of the drug at the time of his death. He is buried at Holliman Cemetery in Milam County, Texas, with his body previously donated to the University of Texas.

Championships and accomplishments
Global Wrestling Federation
GWF Tag Team Championship (1 time) – with Johnny Hawk
Pro Wrestling Illustrated
PWI ranked him #202 of the 500 best singles wrestlers in the PWI 500 in 1999
 PWI ranked him #494 of the Top 500 Singles Wrestlers of the "PWI Years" in 2003

See also
 List of premature professional wrestling deaths

References

External links 
 
 
 Bobby Duncum Jr. obituary

1965 births
2000 deaths
20th-century American male actors
American male professional wrestlers
Dallas Texans (Arena) players
Drug-related deaths in Texas
People from Amarillo, Texas
Professional wrestlers from Texas
20th-century professional wrestlers
GWF Tag Team Champions